
Gabel may refer to:

People
 Gabel (surname)

Places

 Bahr el Gabel, the former name of the Central Equatoria province of Sudan
 Gabel (known as Deutsch Gabel between 1901 and 1945), former name of the town of Jablonné v Podještědí, Liberec Region, Czech Republic
 Gabel an der Adler, former name of the town of Jablonné nad Orlicí, Pardubice Region, Czech Republic

Other uses
 The Catlin Gabel School, a pre-K to 12 school in Oregon
 , an Italian textile company

See also
 Gabelle, a former French tax on salt
 Gable (disambiguation)